The Treaty of Fort Stanwix was a treaty signed between representatives from the Iroquois and Great Britain (accompanied by negotiators from New Jersey, Virginia and Pennsylvania) in 1768 at Fort Stanwix. It was negotiated between Sir William Johnson, his deputy George Croghan, and representatives of the Iroquois.

The treaty established a Line of Property following the Ohio River that ceded the Kentucky portion of the Virginia Colony to the British Crown, as well as most of what is now West Virginia. The treaty also settled land claims between the Iroquois and the Penn family; the lands thereby acquired by American colonists in Pennsylvania were known as the New Purchase.

Treaty
The purpose of the conference was to adjust the boundary line between Indian lands and the Thirteen Colonies set forth in the Royal Proclamation of 1763. The British government hoped a new boundary line might bring an end to the rampant frontier violence between Native Americans and American colonists. Native Americans hoped a new, permanent line might prevent further encroachment of their lands from the colonists.

The final treaty was signed on November 5 with one signatory for each of the Six Nations and in the presence of representatives from the colonies of New Jersey, Virginia and Pennsylvania as well as Johnson. The Native American nations present received gifts and cash totaling £10,460 7s. 3d. sterling, the highest payment ever made from the British Crown to Native Americans. The treaty established a Line of Property which extended the earlier proclamation line of the Alleghenies (the divide between the Ohio and coastal watersheds), much farther to the west.  The line ran near Fort Pitt and followed the Ohio River as far as the Tennessee River, effectively ceding the Kentucky portion of the Virginia Colony to the Crown, as well as most of what is now West Virginia. The British government had recently confirmed ownership of the lands south and west of the Kanawha to the Cherokee by the Treaty of Hard Labour. During the Fort Stanwix proceedings, the British negotiators were astonished to learn that the Six Nations still maintained a nominal claim over much of Kentucky, which they wanted to be added into the consideration. In addition, the Shawnee did not agree to this treaty, contesting colonial Virginian settlements between the Alleghenies and Ohio until the 1774 Treaty of Camp Charlotte.

Although the Six Nations of New York had previously recognized colonial rights southeast of the Ohio River at the 1752 Treaty of Logstown, they continued to claim ownership (by conquest) over all land as far south as the Tennessee River. They had reserved this territory for decades as a hunting ground. They still considered the Tennessee their boundary with the Cherokee and other "Southern" tribes. Although representatives of the Indian nations who occupied these lands, primarily the Shawnee and Delaware, were present at the negotiations in 1768, they were not signatories and had no real role in the Iroquois' sale of their homeland. The Iroquois hoped that by releasing Ohio lands, they could take pressure off their own home territories in the New York and Pennsylvania areas. Rather than secure peace, the Fort Stanwix treaty helped set the stage for the next round of hostilities between Native Americans and American colonists along the Ohio River, which would culminate in Dunmore's War.

The treaty also settled land claims between the Six Nations and the Penn family, the proprietors of Pennsylvania, where the lands acquired in 1768 were referred to as the "New Purchase". Due to disputes about the physical boundaries of the settlement, however, the final treaty line would not be fully agreed upon for another five years. The final portion of the Line of Property in Pennsylvania, called the Purchase line in the State, was fixed in 1773 by representatives from the Six Nations and Pennsylvania who met at a spot called Canoe Place at the confluence of West Branch of the Susquehanna River and Cush Cushion Creek in what is now Cherry Tree, Pennsylvania.

American settlers pushing westward and opportunities for economic development turned the attention of investors and land speculators to the area west of the Appalachians. In response to demands by settlers and speculators, colonial authorities sought further land cessions from the Iroquois and Cherokee. The Treaty of Lochaber with the Cherokee followed in 1770, adjusting boundaries established in the Treaty of Hard Labour, whereby the Cherokee withdrew their claim to parts of the same country, encompassing the south part of present-day West Virginia.

References

Further reading
 Billington, Ray A. "The Fort Stanwix Treaty of 1768," New York History (1944), 25#2 pp. 182–194 in JSTOR
 Halsey, Francis Whiting. The Old New York Frontier, New York; Charles Scribner's Sons, 1901 (Part 3, Chapter 2: "The Fort Stanwix Deed, and Patents that Followed It (1768–1770)," pp. 99–105)
 Marshall, Peter. "Sir William Johnson and the Treaty of Fort Stanwix, 1768." Journal of American Studies (1967) 1#2 pp 149–179.

Primary sources
 Complete Text of the Treaty of Fort Stanwix, 1768
 The Documentary History of the State of New York, by E.B. O'Callaghan, M.D.; Albany: Weed, Parsons & Co., 1850 (Vol. 1 pp. 379–381 text of treaty of 1768; also extensive correspondence of Sir William Johnson)

External links

1768 Boundary Line Treaty of Fort Stanwix

Legal history of Canada
Pre-statehood history of Pennsylvania
Fort Stanwix
Fort Stanwix
1768 in the Thirteen Colonies
1768 treaties
Rome, New York
Iroquois
Native American history of Pennsylvania